The Cambridge Orphans were a minor league baseball team based in Cambridge, Massachusetts in 1899. The Orphans briefly played as members of the New England League in 1899, before relocating during the season. Cambridge played home games at Charles River Park, which Cambridge used in an unsuccessful attempt to secure a charter American League team in 1900, after the Orphans had folded.

History
The 1899 Cambridge Orphans began minor league play when New England League expanded to eight teams, adding a franchise in Cambridge. The Brockton Shoemakers, Fitchburg, Manchester Manchesters, Newport Colts, Pawtucket Colts Portland Phenoms and Taunton Herrings began the season joining Cambridge in league play. The New England League folded during the season after Cambridge had relocated prior to the league folding.

On May 29, 1899, Cambridge had a 3–13 record when the franchise transferred to Lowell. The franchise quickly folded on June 1, 1899, after four games based in Lowell. The Cambridge/Lowell Orphans of the New England League ended their 1899 season with an overall record of 4–16, with G.H. Spalding serving as manager in both cities. The New England League did not return to play in the 1900 season.

In 1900, Cambridge mayor Charles H. Porter was part of a group that attempted to secure a Boston franchise in the new American League. Porter negotiated for the club to play in Charles River Park and had selected a person to run the franchise, but the Cambridge group backed out after American League supporters met with a rival group. Subsequently, Boston joined the American League in 1901 and formed today's Boston Red Sox.

The Orphans were followed by the 1934 Cambridge Cantabs, who played as members of the eight–team Class B level Northeastern League.

The ballparks
The 1899 Cambridge Orphans played minor league home games at Charles River Park.

Year–by–year record

Notable alumni

Ed Glenn (1899)
Mike Mahoney (1899)
Frank Quinlan (1899)
Tom Smith (1899)

See also
Cambridge Orphans players

References

External links
Baseball Reference

Defunct minor league baseball teams
Cambridge, Massachusetts
Defunct baseball teams in Massachusetts
Baseball teams established in 1899
Baseball teams disestablished in 1899
New England League teams